Rabdophaga dubiosa is a gall midge which forms galls on the young shoots of willow (Salix species).

Description
The swelling is broader than that of the gall of R. karschi and contains individual larva in separate chambers that run together. The similar looking gall of R. pierreana only has one large chamber containing red larvae, while the larvae of dubiosa are yellow or light orange. Pupation takes place in the gall and the pupa does not have a tooth near the base of the antenna. In Britain, the gall has been recorded on eared willow (S. aurita) and creeping willow (S. repens). Elsewhere the gall has been found on S. alba,  S. caprea, S. cinerea, S. foetida, S. helvetica and S. purpurea.

Distribution
Found in the Czech Republic, Finland, Great Britain and Romania

References

dubiosa
Nematoceran flies of Europe
Gall-inducing insects
Insects described in 1913
Taxa named by Jean-Jacques Kieffer
Willow galls